Anna Harriet Heyer (30 August 1909 Little Rock, Arkansas – 12 August 2002 Fort Worth, Texas) was a distinguished American academic music librarian, musicologist, and bibliographer who for 26 years, from 1940 to 1966, headed the Music Library at University of North Texas.

Career 
Otto Kinkeldey, a renowned music librarian and musicologist, had given a lecture in 1937 at the first joint meeting between the American Library Association and the Music Library Association in New York City.  In his lecture, Kinkeldey outlined a concept for an appropriate education in music librarianship.  Until reading the transcript, Heyer had never contemplated a specialization in music librarianship — she had not even known it existed.  The concept intrigued her because, in her words, "It would give me a chance to be within an interest that I like and still do library work."

Heyer traveled to Columbia University the summer of 1938 to enroll in a course taught by Richard Angell in "Music Library Administration" — the first any such course had been offered in the country. She stayed on at Columbia for the academic year 1938–1939, earning a Master of Science in Library Science, June 1939.

After spending a year working for the libraries at the University of Texas at Austin, Heyer, in 1940, accepted a position as the first full-time Music Librarian at the University of North Texas, whose College of Music (then referred to as School of Music), had, that same year, upgraded its 1939 induction as Associate member of the National Association of Schools of Music to Institutional member.

Heyer rapidly strengthened the Music Library, which already housed formidable collections, into a major music resource institution.  She also forged music librarianship as a field of academic study by teaching the first known academic courses in the discipline.  When she arrived, North Texas had acquired sizable collections that included orchestral scores, sheet music, phonograph recordings, and the Carnegie Corporation reproducing unit.

While working for North Texas, she earned a Master of Music degree from the University of Michigan in 1943.

In 1957, Heyer published a groundbreaking bibliography, Historical Sets, Collected Editions, and Monuments of Music: A Guide to their Contents.  This reference stood for decades as one of the essential reference tools in the field of Western classical music.  For comprehensive research music libraries, it became a guide for holdings.

Education 
 1930: Bachelor of Arts, Mathematics with a minor in piano, Texas Christian University
 1930: Bachelor of Music, Texas Christian University
 1933: Bachelor of Science in Library Science, University of Illinois
 Summer 1938: Studied Music Library Administration under Richard Sloane Angell (1905–1985), School of Library Service, Columbia University — Angell was the music librarian at Columbia
 1939: Master of Science in Library Science, Columbia University
 1943: Master of Music, University of Michigan

Selected publications 
 Policies of Cataloging and Classification in Self-Contained Music Libraries (masters thesis), by Anna Harriet Heyer, Columbia University (1939) 
 State and Resources of Musicology in the United States (masters thesis), by Anna Harriet Heyer, University of Michigan (August 1943) 
 A Check-list of Publications of Music, compiled Anna Harriet Heyer, University of Michigan (1944) 
 A Bibliography of Contemporary Music in the Music Library, University of North Texas (March 1955) 
 Historical Sets, Collected Editions, and Monuments of Music: A Guide to Their Contents, by Anna Harriet Heyer, American Library Association
 First Edition (1957) 
 Third Edition (1980) 
 Bibliography of Music Bibliographies, by Anna Harriet Heyer, self-published (1967) 
 University of North Texas Music Library: Its History: 1940–1965, by Anna Harriet Heyer, University of North Texas (1991)

References 
General references
 Anna Harriet Heyer, Oral History (transcript), University of North Texas (1991) 
 Anna Harriet Heyer Collection, 1950–1993 University of North Texas 

Inline citations

American women musicologists
American women librarians
American women music educators
Texas classical music
Texas Christian University alumni
University of Illinois School of Information Sciences alumni
Columbia University School of Library Service alumni
University of Michigan School of Music, Theatre & Dance alumni
University of North Texas College of Music faculty
1909 births
2002 deaths
Women bibliographers
20th-century American musicologists
20th-century American women writers
20th-century American women musicians
20th-century American musicians
Music librarians
American librarians